Gilbert Osborne Hayward (16 October 1917—9 October  2011) was a World War II cryptographer and inventor of the first electronic seal security device.

Career
As a pupil at Kilburn Grammar School, Hayward became captivated by machines and science. He was the youngest member of the British Astronomical Association, and constructed his own reflecting telescope. He spent weeks in a junkyard to find parts with which he remade an old green Bentley and a Scott Super Squirrel motorcycle, which he then rode. Hayward's mother did not allow him go to university, as a result, Hayward left school at 16 to become an apprentice at Dollis Hill, where he collaborated with Dr Eric Speight on making the TIM speaking clock service.

During the Second World War, Hayward worked at the Post Office Research Station at Dollis Hill with Tommy Flowers, developing the Tunny and Colossus, decryption machines which were crucial to the development of later computers. By the culmination of the war, as many as 15 Tunny machines were used at Bletchley Park, supplying Allied leaders close to 300 messages from the German High Command per week. Amongst other things, Tunny gave important intelligence for D-Day." Over 13,000 messages were read in total.

During World War II, Hayward served in Egypt with the Intelligence Corps, where he developed bugging equipment to listen to conversations between captured German prisoners of war. Expecting to be dropped into Turkey to sabotage telecoms systems, Hayward was instead called back to London to, and was assigned to put effort on code breaking.

At Bletchley Park, Hayward was at the helm of a team of around 12 post office engineers worked to check machines and keep them functioning. At the twilight of the war, he helped dismantle the code breaking machines and reinstall two Colossus machines at Eastcote, North London.

After the war, Hayward worked on a secret voice encipherment system before moving to Ghana to install telecoms networks. In the 1950s, during the Malayan Emergency, Hayward joined the special of the Royal Malaysian Police and was tasked with  designing “special techniques devices” for use against the Malayan National Liberation Army (MNLA), the militant arm of the Malayan Communist Party (MCP).

By the 1980s, Hayward had patented the first electronic security seal, setting up the company Encrypta Electronics with his son Mark to manufacture the product. The devices are still used widely in the fields of distribution and transport. In the 1990s he helped researchers at The National Museum of Computing (TNMOC) rebuild the Tunny and Colossus machines by crafting new parts from blueprints he had kept against the orders of Winston Churchill who was concerned that they could fall into Soviet hands. He was honoured with a special medal for his services to codebreaking in 1996.

Hayward's son Mark told BBC Radio 4 that it was 'somewhat disappointing that because he worked in secret work, like all these chaps did, that they were never truly honoured by the country for the contribution they made'.

References

British cryptographers
1917 births
2011 deaths